The following railroads operate in the U.S. state of California.


Common freight carriers
Freight carrier information is current .

Other

Mare Island Rail Service (MIRS)
Oakland Global Rail Enterprise (OGRE)
West Oakland Pacific Railroad
Port of Oakland Railway (POAK)
Southern California Railroad (SCRR)
USG Corporation (USG)

Passenger carriers

Intercity
Amtrak (AMTK): California Zephyr, Coast Starlight, Southwest Chief, Sunset Limited
Amtrak California (CDTX): Capitol Corridor, Pacific Surfliner and San Joaquin
California High-Speed Rail (under construction)

Commuter rail
Altamont Corridor Express (ACE)
Arrow
Caltrain (JPBX)
Coaster (SDNX)
Metrolink (SCAX)
Peninsula Commute
Sonoma–Marin Area Rail Transit (SMART)

Local
Bay Area Rapid Transit (BART)
 eBART
 Coliseum–Oakland International Airport line (people mover)
Los Angeles County Metro Rail (LACZ)
San Francisco Municipal Railway (MUNI)
Muni Metro
Market Street Railway (E Embarcadero and F Market & Wharves lines)
San Francisco cable car system
 OC Streetcar (under construction)
Sacramento RT Light Rail (SCRT)
San Diego Trolley (SDTI)
Santa Clara Valley Transportation Authority light rail (VTA)
Sprinter (SDNX)

Excursion

Calico and Odessa Railroad (C&OR)
Fillmore and Western Railway (FWRY)
Napa Valley Wine Train (NVRR)
Niles Canyon Railway (NCRY)
Placerville and Sacramento Valley Railroad
Port of Los Angeles Waterfront Red Car Line (service temporarily suspended)
Poway-Midland Railroad
Roaring Camp & Big Trees Narrow Gauge Railroad (RCBT)
Sacramento Southern Railroad (SSRR)
Santa Cruz, Big Trees and Pacific Railway (SCBG)
Sierra Railroad (SERA)
California Western Railroad (also known as the Skunk Train) (CWR)
Sacramento RiverTrain (SYPD)
Western Pacific Railroad Museum (WPRM)
Western Railway Museum
Yosemite Mountain Sugar Pine Railroad (YMSP)
Yreka Western Railroad (YW)

Amusement park
Disneyland Monorail
Disneyland Railroad
Ghost Town & Calico Railroad

Defunct railroads

Private carriers

Albion Lumber Company
American River Land and Lumber Company
Arcata and Mad River Railroad
Bayside Logging Railroad
Bear Harbor and Eel River Railroad
Birch and Smart Railroad
Brookings Lumber and Box Company
Butte and Plumas Railway
C.D. Danaher Pine Company
California Door Company
California Redwood Company
Camino, Cable and Northern Railroad
Carson and Tahoe Lumber and Fluming Company
Caspar, South Fork and Eastern Railroad
Charles W. Kitts
Clover Valley Lumber Company
Crane Creek Lumber Company
Crescent City and Smith River Railroad
Del Norte Southern Railroad
Descanso, Alpine and Pacific Railway
Diamond Match Company
Duncan Mill Land and Lumber Company
Eagle Mountain Railroad
El Dorado Lumber Company
Elk Creek Railroad
Feather River Pine Mills, Inc.
Fruit Growers Supply Company
Georgia-Pacific
Glen Blair Redwood Company
Glendale Railroad
Goodyear Redwood Lumber Company
Grande Ronde Pine Company
Gualala River Railroad
Gualala River Railway
Hammond and Little River Redwood Company
Hammond Lumber Company
Hammond Redwood Lumber Company
Hardy Creek and Eel River Railroad
Hobart Southern Railroad
Humboldt Bay and Trinidad Logging and Lumbering Company
Humboldt Logging Railway
Humboldt Lumber Mill Company
Humboldt Northern Railway
Hutchison Lumber Company
Imperial Gypsum Company
L.E. White Lumber Company (Greenwood Railroad)
Lake Valley Narrow Gauge Railroad
Little River Redwood Company
Long-Bell Lumber Company
Madera Sugar Pine Company
Mammoth Copper Mining Company
Marsh Lumber Company
McCloud Railway
Metropolitan Redwood Lumber Company
Michigan–California Lumber Company
Minors Railroad
Mono Lake Lumber Company
Mono Lake Railway and Lumber Company
Navarro Lumber Company
Northern Redwood Lumber Company
Outer Harbor Dock and Wharf Company
Pacific Coast Borax Company (Borate and Daggett Railroad)
Pacific Lumber Company
Pacific Portland Cement Company
Parr-Richmond Industrial Corporation
PeopleMover
Pittsburg Railroad
R.E. Danaher Company
Rainbow Mill and Lumber Company
Raymond Granite Company
Read Timber and Lumber Company
Red River Lumber Company
Red Rock Railroad
Rockport Redwood Company
Selby Smelting and Lead Company
Shaver Lake Lumber Company (Shaver Lake Railroad)
Sierra Nevada Wood and Lumber Company
Siskiyou Electric Light and Power Company
Sonoma Magnesite Tramway
South San Francisco Land and Improvement Company
Southwestern Portland Cement Company
Stearns Lumber Company
Stone Canyon and Pacific Railway
Sugar Pine Lumber Company
Tecopa Railroad
Ten Mile Railroad
Terry Lumber Company (Anderson and Bella Vista Railroad)
Towle Brothers Company
Tulare Valley Railroad
Union Lumber Company (Fort Bragg Railroad)
Union Sugar Company
Usal Redwood Company
Viewliner Train of Tomorrow
Watsonville Traction Company
Weed Lumber Company 
West Side Flume and Lumber Company
West Side Lumber Company railway
Western Meat Company
Western Plant Services, Inc.
Western Redwood Lumber Company
Wood Sheldon Lumber Company
Yellow Aster Mining Company
Yosemite Lumber Company
Yosemite Sugar Pine Lumber Company

Notes

References

Association of American Railroads (2003), Railroad Service in California (PDF). Retrieved May 25, 2005.
Santa Fe Railroad (1945), Along Your Way, Rand McNally, Chicago, Illinois.

See also
 List of San Francisco Bay Area trains

External links

Archival collections
Guide to Railroads in California by L. M. Clement. Special Collections and Archives, The UC Irvine Libraries, Irvine, California.

California
 
 
 
Railroads